Warner Robins (typically ) is a city in the U.S. state of Georgia, located in Houston and Peach counties in the central part of the state. It is currently Georgia's eleventh-largest incorporated city, with a population of 80,308 in the 2020 Census.

The city is the main component of the Warner Robins Metropolitan Statistical Area, including the entirety of Houston, Peach, and Pulaski counties, which had a census population of 201,469 in 2020; it, in turn, is a component of a larger trade area, the Macon–Warner Robins–Fort Valley Combined Statistical Area, with an estimated 2018 population of 423,572. Robins Air Force Base, a major U.S. Air Force maintenance and logistics complex that was founded as the Warner Robins Air Depot in 1942, is located just east of the city limits; the base's expansion and the suburbanization of nearby Macon have led to the city's rapid growth in the post-World War II era.

History
Warner Robins was founded in 1942 when the small farming community of Wellston was renamed for General Augustine Warner Robins (1882-1940) of the United States Army Air Corps, which later became the United States Air Force. It was incorporated as a town in 1943 and as a city in 1956.

The 1940 census shows that the community of Wellston was sparsely populated and inhabited primarily by farmers and their families. Its most notable landmark was a stop on the railroad line. Wellston also had a small sawmill and a grocery store. Peach orchards covered parts of the surrounding land.

This changed during World War II. The War Department made plans to build an air depot in the Southeast. With the assistance of influential U.S. Representative Carl Vinson, Wellston community leader Charles Bostic "Boss" Watson worked with officials in Macon to make a bid to locate this air depot in Houston County. In June 1941, the U.S. government accepted this offer, which included  of land.

This air force base was initially called Wellston Army Air Depot when it opened in 1942. The first commander was Colonel Charles E. Thomas. He wanted to name this depot in honor of his mentor Augustine Warner Robins, who was called by his middle name, Warner. Regulations prevented him from doing this, which required the base to be named after the nearest town. Not deterred by this, Colonel Thomas persuaded Boss Watson and the other community leaders to rename the town of Wellston. So on September 1, 1942, the town was given the new name of Warner Robins. Soon thereafter, on October 14, 1942, the base was renamed to become Warner Robins Army Air Depot. The city has a unique name, shared with no other town in the United States.

Robins Air Force Base is not within the city limits of the town but is across U.S. Highway 129 (Georgia State Highway 247), which serves as a boundary between the base and the city.

In 2018, First Solar announced a project for a 200-megawatt,  solar panel facility in Twiggs County east of Warner Robins. The facility would be the largest solar facility in the southeast.

Tornadoes
Tornadoes have continually plagued the city since its inception with the 1950s seeing at least four catastrophic tornadoes strike the area. The first one occurred on April 30, 1953, when an F4 tornado with winds of over 200 mph hit the city and portions of Robins Air Force Base, killing 18 people and injuring 300 more. That same day, a second tornado that was rated F2 damaged the northwest side of town. Just ten months later on March 13, 1954, a long-tracked F1 tornado struck the town, killing one and injuring five. Three years later, on April 5, 1957, a long-tracked F2 tornado family hit the northwest side of the city, causing considerable damage. To date, at least nine tornadoes have hit the town and the surrounding area.

Geography
Warner Robins is located at  (32.608720ºN, −83.638027ºE).

Government
 LaRhonda Patrick rocks election. She is the first woman and first person of color to be elected mayor of Warner Robins.

Since 2013, most of the city is within the 147th district of the Georgia House of Representatives, currently represented by Republican member Heath Clark.

Transportation

Major roads
U.S. Highway 129 leads north  to downtown Macon and south  to Hawkinsville. GA-247 follows U.S. Highway 129 throughout the city, and leads north to Macon and south to Hawkinsville. GA-96 leads east-northeast  to Jeffersonville and west  to Fort Valley.

Pedestrians and cycling
 The Walk at Sandy Run
Walker's Pond Trail
 Wellston Trail

Demographics

2020 census

As of the 2020 United States census, there were 80,308 people, 29,742 households, and 19,256 families residing in the city.

2010 census
As of the census of 2010, there were 66,588 people, 19,550 households, and 13,078 families residing in the city. The racial makeup of the city included 50.00% White, 36.60% African American, 0.30% Native American, 2.60% Asian, 0.07% Pacific Islander, .10% from other races, and 2.60% from two or more races. Hispanic or Latino people of any race were 15.60% of the population.

There were 19,550 households, out of which 34.3% had children under the age of 18 living with them, 46.3% were married couples living together, 16.6% had a female householder with no husband present, and 33.1% were non-families. 28.1% of all households were made up of individuals, and 7.5% had someone living alone who was 65 years of age or older. The average household size was 2.48 and the average family size was 3.03.

In the city, the population was spread out, with 28.0% under the age of 18, 9.6% from 18 to 24, 31.9% from 25 to 44, 20.2% from 45 to 64, and 10.8% who were 65 years of age or older. The median age was 33 years. For every 100 females, there were 94.2 males. For every 100 females age 18 and over, there were 90.1 males.

The median income for a household in the city was $38,401, and the median income for a family was $44,217. Males had a median income of $33,030 versus $24,855 for females. The per capita income for the city was $18,121. About 11.0% of families and 13.2% of the population were below the poverty line, including 20.5% of those under age 18 and 8.6% of those age 65 or over.

Quality of life
In 2009, Business Week magazine named Warner Robins the best place in Georgia to raise a family. The ranking was bestowed again for 2010. The Warner Robins Area Chamber was named one of the top three chambers of commerce in the U.S. for a chamber in its division in 2009 by the American Chamber of Commerce Executives Association. In 2012, CNN Money named Warner Robins No. 7 on its Best Places To Live list for America's best small cities.

Climate
Warner Robins has a humid subtropical climate (Köppen Cfa). Snowfall is a moderately rare event. Warner Robins-area historical tornado activity is slightly above the state average. It is 86% greater than the overall U.S. average.

Museum of Aviation

Warner Robins is home to the Museum of Aviation, which honors the history of military aviation. Located next to the Air Force base, the museum contains exhibits on military memorabilia, airplanes and ground vehicles, the Tuskegee Airmen, and Operation Desert Storm. It is the second largest museum sponsored by the United States Air Force and the fourth-most visited museum in the Department of Defense. It is also the largest tourist attraction outside Atlanta in the state of Georgia.

Baseball and softball
According to Warner Robins residents in 1958 Claude Lewis, director of the Warner Robins Recreation Department, invented the game of tee-ball. The first game was played in March of that year with 20 children participating. Lewis wrote rules for the new game and sent rule books out to recreation departments all over the country. In 2006, a field was dedicated and named for Lewis, "the father of tee-ball", at the Warner Robins American Little League complex.

Warner Robins Little League won the 2007 Little League World Series 3–2 against Tokyo Kitasuna Little League of Tokyo, Japan.

On December 9, 2008, the Little League International Board of Directors unanimously voted for Warner Robins to become the new Southeast Region Headquarters of Little League Baseball and Softball. Games began to be played in Warner Robins in 2010.

The Warner Robins American Little League girls' softball team won the 2009 Little League Softball World Series by defeating Crawford, Texas, making Warner Robins the only Little League to have won both a baseball and a softball title.

The Warner Robins American Little League girls' softball team defended their 2009 championship by defeating Burbank, California in the 2010 Little League Softball World Series. By doing so, Warner Robins became only the fourth Little League program to produce back-to-back championship teams, and the first since Waco, Texas, which had won in 2003–2004.

EDIMGIAFAD motto 

The official motto of Warner Robins is "EDIMGIAFAD", which is an acronym for "Every Day In Middle Georgia Is Armed Forces Appreciation Day" (originally: Every Day In Middle Georgia Is Air Force Appreciation Day). The coining of this phrase is attributed to Dr. Dan Callahan, a local civic leader. In 2010, Dr. Callahan and a group of community leaders launched an effort to change the acronym to "EDIUSAIAFAD", as part of a movement to take the sentiment national: "Every Day in the USA is Armed Forces Appreciation Day".

Economy

Robins Air Force Base is one of the largest employers in the state of Georgia and directly contributes over 25,000 military, civil service, and contractor jobs to the local economy. It has provided economic stability for Warner Robins that has benefited the entire Middle Georgia community.

The city of Warner Robins is working on redeveloping and renewing areas that have suffered from urban decay and/or abandonment through neglect and city growth. The city's plans include development of a centralized downtown center "for pedestrian-oriented businesses, culture and community gathering" to be re-established at Commercial Circle in order to "connect commerce and culture back to Downtown." 

In May 2009 Warner Robins was listed by the Adversity Index as one of four Georgia metro areas that have had less than nine months of recession over the past fifteen years and have only recently been affected by the Global Financial Crisis of 2008–2009.

In June 2011, Warner Robins was listed in Wired magazine as one of 12 small cities that are driving the "Knowledge Economy".  Georgia was the only Southeastern state listed, and Warner Robins was one of two Georgia cities ranked (the other one being Hinesville-Ft. Stewart). The rankings featured small cities that are luring knowledge workers and entrepreneurs and which have both a relatively high median family income and a relatively high percentage of creative workers who drive the economy.

Houston Medical Center 

Houston County Hospital was dedicated on July 2, 1960, with 50 beds. The hospital was renamed Houston Medical Center in 1986 after renovations. The patient rooms were converted at this time from semi-private to private, with 186 beds available. The addition of a new five-story northwest tower was completed in 2009, making a total of 237 beds. Houston Medical Center is part of the Houston Healthcare system, which serves over 300,000 people annually.

Football
High school football has long been a storied and celebrated pastime in Warner Robins, with the city laying claim to state championships, national championships, college stars, and NFL players.

The annual Northside vs. Warner Robins game draws an estimated 21,000 fans and was named the #3 rivalry in the country by USA Today in 2006.

Warner Robins High School won two National Championships, in 1976 and 1981. It won six State Championships, in 1976, 1981, 1988, 2004, 2020 and 2021.

Northside High School was crowned State Champion in 2006, 2007 and 2014.

Warner Robins Little Theatre 

The Warner Robins Little Theatre was established in 1962 as a non-profit community theatre. This organization now owns their theatre playhouse debt-free. The theatre continues to thrive. Five main shows are produced every year. Occasionally workshops and other special events are held for the Middle Georgia community.

Popular culture
The bands Rehab, Stillwater, Doc Holliday, Sugar Creek, and Luke's Cabbage Store are based in Warner Robins.

Photo gallery

Local media

Newspapers
 The Telegraph, daily
 The Sun, a section of the Telegraph printed weekly devoted to news in Houston and Peach Counties
 Houston Home Journal, twice weekly, the legal organ for Houston County

Television stations
Warner Robins is part of the Macon DMA, which is the nation's 120th largest television market. See the box below for local television stations:

Radio stations
Warner Robins is part of the Macon Arbitron Metro, which is the nation's 130th largest radio market with a person 12+ population of 372,400. See the box below for the local radio stations:

Education

The portion of Warner Robins in Houston County is served by the Houston County School System. The portion of the city in Peach County is served by Peach County School District.

Branch campuses of colleges and universities
 Central Georgia Technical College
 Fort Valley State University
 Georgia College & State University
 Georgia Military College
 Mercer University
 Middle Georgia State University

High schools
 Houston County High School
 Houston County Career and Technology Center
 Northside High School
 Warner Robins High School
 Veterans High School (in nearby unincorporated Kathleen, Georgia)
 Elberta Center
 Crossroads Center (alternative school)

Libraries

The library is the Nola Brantley Memorial Library.

Notable people

 Eddie Anderson — professional football player
 Russell Branyan — Major League Baseball player
 James Brooks — professional football player
 Cortez Broughton — professional football player
 Marquez Callaway — former Tennessee Volunteers football player; current New Orleans Saints wide receiver
 Betty Cantrell — Miss America 2016
 Kal Daniels — Major League Baseball player
 Robert Davis — professional football player with the Washington Redskins
 Travis Denning — country music singer
 Bobbie Eakes — Emmy Award-nominated actress; singer
 Jake Fromm — former Georgia Bulldogs quarterback, current NFL free agent quarterback
 Phil Horan — former drummer in the post-rock band Maserati
 Willis Hunt — senior federal judge for the U.S. Northern District of Georgia
 Jessie James — pop singer
 Mark Johnson — Major League Baseball player
 Abry Jones — professional football player
 Daniel-Leon Kit — entertainer, web personality
 Amanda Kozak — Miss Georgia 2006
 Kyle Moore — professional football player
 David Perdue — former U.S. Senator
 Sonny Perdue — Governor of Georgia, 2003–2011; United States Secretary of Agriculture, 2017–2021
 Victoria Principal — actress
 Willie Reid — professional football player
 Mike Richardson — professional football player
 Robert Lee Scott, Jr. — U.S. Air Force Brigadier General and pilot; wrote autobiography God is My Co-Pilot
 Ken Shamrock — professional MMA fighter and professional wrestler
 Ron Simmons — professional football player and professional wrestler
 Ben Smith — #22 overall in the 1990 NFL Draft by the Philadelphia Eagles; played defensive back for Philadelphia Eagles, Denver Broncos, and Arizona Cardinals
 Chansi Stuckey — professional football player
 Byron Walker — former professional football player, Seattle Seahawks
Robert Waymouth — chemistry professor at Stanford University
 Steven Nelson - professional football player

References

External links

 Official Warner Robins city website
 Official community online guide magazine
 Warner Robins Chamber of Commerce
 New Georgia Encyclopedia article on Warner Robins
 Air Force Acquisition Civilian Careers

 
Cities in Georgia (U.S. state)
Cities in Houston County, Georgia
Cities in Peach County, Georgia
Populated places established in 1942